Slum Bala is a 2008 Indian Kannada-language film directed by Sumana Kittur, starring Duniya Vijay, Shubha Poonja and Shashi Kumar in lead roles.

Cast 

 Duniya Vijay as Balakrishna alias Slum Bala
 Shubha Poonja as Mallige
 Shashi Kumar as Police Inspector Shantaram
 Umashree
 Girija Lokesh
 B. Suresha as Prasad Nayak
 Achyuth Kumar
 Dharma as Bhadravathi Manja
 Sathya Prakash
 Dr Banjagere Jayaprakash

Production 
Sumana Kittur narrated the story of Slum Bala to Duniya Vijay, who agreed to star in the film only if Kittur directed it.

Music

Reception

Critical response 

R G Vijayasarathy of Rediff.com scored the film at 3 out of 5 stars and says "Music director Arjun has done remarkable job both as a composer and back ground scorer. Slum Bala is a must-see film for all those who love good and realistic cinema". Bangalore Mirror wrote "A disappointment for Vijay’s fans is the absence of daring stunts he is known for. The film is a den of thieves. Apart from the mother and the love interest of Bala (played by Shuba Poonja), every other character is either corrupt or has a negative shade. This could have helped if the film was a thriller. But it seems the director was more intent documenting  the life of Slum Bala than provide a quicker narrative of a corrupt society". The New Indian Express wrote "Nayak's friend promises not only to cancel the police order against Bala but also to handover the cable business to the latter. Bala accomplishes the task but circumstances compel Shantaram to eliminate Bala. Slum Bala is a take on politics".

References

2000s Kannada-language films
2008 films
Films directed by Sumana Kittur